Paiania (or Paeanea or Peania , , before 1915: Λιόπεσι - Liopesi, ; Arvanitika: Λοπε̱σ romanized: Lopës) is a town and a municipality in East Attica, Greece. It is an eastern suburb of Athens, located east of Mount Hymettus. It is 11 km east of Athens city centre.

Paiania is home to the Vorres Museum of Folk and Contemporary Art, the Foundation European Art Center (EUARCE) of Greece. the broadcasting facilities of Greek television station Oren TV and the former training facilities of football club Panathinaikos FC. Greek National Road 89 passes through the town, Motorway 6 passes east of it. The town was renamed to reflect association with the ancient deme of Paeania.

History
In the late Middle Ages, the area was the site of Albanian (Arvanite) settlement, as can be seen from its toponym.

Municipality
The municipality Paiania was formed at the 2011 local government reform by the merger of the following 2 former municipalities, that became municipal units:
Glyka Nera
Paiania

The municipality has an area of 53.155 km2, the municipal unit 43.917 km2. The municipal unit of Paiania also includes the village of Argithea (pop. 1,024).

Notable people 
Demades (380-318 BC), orator and demagogue.
Demosthenes (384-322 BC), orator and demagogue.
 Jaqueline Tyrwhitt (1905-1983), British architect and founder of the garden of Speroza, Mediterranean Garden Society
Philippides of Peania (293 BC), archon Basileus and son of Philomelos.

References

Bibliography

External links
Official website 
https://euarceblog.wixsite.com/euarce

Municipalities of Attica
Populated places in East Attica
Arvanite settlements